Joshua Saavedra (born August 10, 2003) is an American soccer player who plays as a midfielder for USL League One side Fort Lauderdale CF as a member of the Inter Miami academy.

Career

Fort Lauderdale CF
Saavedra made his league debut for the club on July 18, 2020, coming on as a 63rd-minute substitute for Francisco Raggio in a 2–0 defeat against Greenville Triumph.

References

External links
Joshua Saavedra at US Soccer Development Academy

2003 births
Living people
American sportspeople of Colombian descent
American soccer players
Soccer players from Florida
People from Miramar, Florida
Association football midfielders
Inter Miami CF II players
USL League One players
Sportspeople from Broward County, Florida